Dillon Michael Tate (born May 1, 1994) is an American professional baseball pitcher for the Baltimore Orioles of Major League Baseball (MLB). He played college baseball at the University of California, Santa Barbara. The Texas Rangers selected Tate in the first round of the 2015 Major League Baseball draft and traded him to the New York Yankees during the 2016 season. He was traded to the Orioles close to the 2018 trade deadline. He made his MLB debut in 2019.

Amateur career
Tate attended Claremont High School in Claremont, California, graduating in 2012. He made the school's baseball team, but received little playing time as a freshman. He then began to train at the Major League Baseball (MLB) Urban Youth Academy in Compton, California. He was not selected in the MLB draft out of high school.

Tate enrolled at the University of California, Santa Barbara, where he played college baseball for the UC Santa Barbara Gauchos. The Gauchos and the Oral Roberts Golden Eagles were the only two Division I programs to offer Tate a scholarship. As a freshman, he appeared in four games, pitching three innings, and had a 9.00 earned run average (ERA). As a sophomore, he served as the Gauchos' closer, finishing the season with a 1.45 ERA, 12 saves, and 46 strikeouts. Tate was expected to enter his junior season in 2015 as the closer again, but was converted into a starting pitcher after an injury to one of the team's starters. He started 14 games in his junior year, pitching to an 8–5 win–loss record with a 2.26 ERA and 111 strikeouts in  innings pitched.

Professional career

Texas Rangers
Considered one of the top prospects for the 2015 MLB draft, the Texas Rangers selected Tate with the fourth overall selection. He signed with the Rangers on June 12, earning a $4.2 million signing bonus.

Tate made his professional debut for the Spokane Indians of the Class A-Short Season Northwest League and was promoted to the Hickory Crawdads of the Class A South Atlantic League in 2016. He spent time on the disabled list with a strained hamstring. Tate pitched 65 innings for Hickory, with a 5.12 ERA, 55 strikeouts, and 27 walks.

New York Yankees
On August 1, 2016, the Rangers traded Tate and fellow prospects Erik Swanson and Nick Green to the New York Yankees for Carlos Beltrán. The Yankees assigned Tate to the Charleston RiverDogs of the South Atlantic League to pitch as a reliever for the remainder of 2016, in order to work with pitching coach Justin Pope to fix various mechanical flaws that can lead to an increase in velocity. In 17.1 innings for Charleston, he posted a 3.12 ERA with a 1.56 WHIP. The Yankees assigned him to the Scottsdale Scorpions of the Arizona Fall League after the regular season, and he was named to the Fall Stars Game.

After missing the start of the 2017 season with a sore shoulder, Tate made nine starts for the Tampa Yankees of the Class A-Advanced Florida State League, pitching to a 2.62 ERA. The Yankees promoted him to the Trenton Thunder of the Class AA Eastern League in August, where he finished the season, posting a 1–2 record with a 3.24 ERA in 25 innings.

Baltimore Orioles
On July 24, 2018, the New York Yankees traded Tate, Cody Carroll, and Josh Rogers to the Baltimore Orioles for Zack Britton. The Orioles added him to their 40-man roster after the season. Tate split the 2018 season between the Trenton Thunder and the Bowie Baysox of the Eastern League, accumulating a 7–5 record with a 4.16 ERA in  innings. Tate returned to Bowie to start the 2019 season.

On July 26, 2019, the Orioles promoted Tate to the major leagues. He made his debut on July 29, allowing three runs over two innings pitched. He finished his rookie season with a 6.43 ERA across 16 appearances. Tate pitched in 12 games for Baltimore in 2020, posting a 3.24 ERA with 14 strikeouts. 

In 2021, Tate appeared in 62 games for the Orioles, registering an 0-6 record and 4.39 ERA with 49 strikeouts in 67.2 innings of work. Tate enjoyed a career year in 2022, appearing in 67 games for Baltimore and posting a 4-4 record and 3.05 ERA with 60 strikeouts and 5 saves in 73.2 innings pitched.

On January 13, 2023, Tate agreed to a one-year, $1.5 million contract with the Orioles, avoiding salary arbitration. On February 16, it was announced that Tate had suffered a flexor strain in late November and would miss the first month of the season as a result.

References

External links

UC Santa Barbara Gauchos bio

1994 births
Living people
African-American baseball players
Baltimore Orioles players
Baseball players from California
Bowie Baysox players
Charleston RiverDogs players
Frederick Keys players
Hickory Crawdads players
Major League Baseball pitchers
People from Claremont, California
People from Harbor City, Los Angeles
Scottsdale Scorpions players
Spokane Indians players
Tampa Yankees players
Trenton Thunder players
UC Santa Barbara Gauchos baseball players
21st-century African-American sportspeople